The Battle of Montecatini was fought in the Val di Nievole on 29 August 1315 between the Republic of Pisa, and the forces of both the Kingdom of Naples and the Republic of Florence. The Ghibelline army of Pisa, commanded by Uguccione della Faggiuola, won a victory over the Guelf armies of the Florentines and their allies. The Neapolitan forces, made up of 3200 cavalry and 30,000-60,000 infantry, were commanded by Philip I of Taranto, while the Pisan forces consisted of 3000 cavalry and 20,000 infantry. 

Philip survived the battle, his eldest son Charles of Taranto and his brother Peter, Count of Eboli and Gravina, were both killed in the fight. Additional deaths included members of 114 Florentine noble families. Francesco della Faggiuola, son of Uguccione, was killed possibly in personal combat with Charles of Taranto.

References

Sources

Conflicts in 1315
Montecatini 1315
Montecatini 1315
Montecatini 1315
1315 in Europe
14th century in the Republic of Florence
14th century in the Kingdom of Naples